In enzymology, a glutathione dehydrogenase (ascorbate) is an enzyme that catalyzes the chemical reaction

2 glutathione + dehydroascorbate  glutathione disulfide + ascorbate

Thus, the two substrates of this enzyme are glutathione and dehydroascorbate, whereas its two products are glutathione disulfide and ascorbate.

This enzyme belongs to the family of oxidoreductases, specifically those acting on a sulfur group of donors with a quinone or similar compound as acceptor.  The systematic name of this enzyme class is glutathione:dehydroascorbate oxidoreductase. Other names in common use include dehydroascorbic reductase, dehydroascorbic acid reductase, glutathione dehydroascorbate reductase, DHA reductase, dehydroascorbate reductase, GDOR, and glutathione:dehydroascorbic acid oxidoreductase.  This enzyme participates in 3 metabolic pathways: ascorbate and aldarate metabolism, glutamate metabolism, and glutathione metabolism.

Structural studies

References

 

EC 1.8.5
Enzymes of known structure